The Troy Trojans college football team represents Troy University as a member of the Sun Belt Conference. The Trojans competes as part of the NCAA Division I Football Bowl Subdivision. The program has had 23 head coaches, and one interim head coach, since it began play during the 1909 season. Since December 2021, Jon Sumrall has served as head coach at Troy.

Key

Coaches

Notes

References

Troy Trojans
Troy Trojans football coaches